Minas Department may refer to:
Minas Department, Neuquén in Argentina
Minas Department, Córdoba in Argentina

Department name disambiguation pages